Sletty, Sleaty, or Slatey (Sléibhte, 'mountains', in Irish), is a civil parish in County Laois, Ireland. It is situated some 2 km north-north-west of the town of Carlow. It was once the see of a  bishopric, founded by Saint Fiacc in the fifth century, but this was later transferred to Leighlin. It was at Sletty, according to James Joyce in his novel Ulysses, that Cormac mac Airt 'suffocated by imperfect deglutition of aliment', i.e. that he choked on a fishbone.

References

Bibliography
 Lewis, S. (1837) Topographical Dictionary of Ireland

Geography of County Laois